Banco San Juan, formally known as the Rural Bank of San Juan, is one of the largest rural banks in the Philippines, ranking second in terms of resources.  The bank is headquartered in Makati, Metro Manila.  It has the distinction for being the first rural bank to join an interbank network, namely BancNet, and the rural bank with the largest branch network on the island of Luzon.  The bank was founded in 1953.

On May 28, 2011, it was announced that Banco San Juan was to be acquired by Banco de Oro Universal Bank.

References

Banks of the Philippines
Banks established in 1953
Companies based in Makati